Rrok Kolë Mirdita (28 September 1939 – 7 December 2015) was an Albanian prelate of the Catholic Church who served as the archbishop of Tiranë-Durrës from 1993 to his death in 2015.

Biography 

Mirdita was ordained a priest on 2 July 1965, aged 25, and served in ethnic Albanian parishes in Bronx and Westchester counties of New York.

On 25 December 1992, aged 53, he was appointed the archbishop of Tiranë-Durrës and consecrated on 25 April  1993 by Pope John Paul II and cardinals Camillo Ruini and Jozef Tomko, along with three other bishops (Zef Simoni,  and Robert Ashta) during the Pope's pastoral visit to Albania. Mirdita was the President of the Episcopal Conference of Albania and the Chairman of Caritas Albania. 

On his initiative St. Paul's Cathedral was built in Tirana. Its triangular architecture, according to the Archbishop's idea, symbolizes the cohabitation of Islam, Eastern Orthodoxy and Catholicism in Albania. The first Holy Mass in the new cathedral was celebrated by Cardinal Angelo Sodano, Vatican's Secretary of State, and Archbishop Mirdita on 27 January 2002. The Archbishop's house was built next to the Eastern Orthodox cathedral and on Christmas 1999, Mirdita and the Eastern Orthodox Archbishop Anastasios (Anastas) greeted parishioners together.  Rrok Mirdita was an Honorary Citizen of Tirana, Albania.

He died at Mother Teresa Hospital in Tirana on 7 December 2015.

References

External links 
 Rrok Mirdita at catholic-hierarchy.org

1939 births
2015 deaths
People from Ulcinj
Albanians in Montenegro
Montenegrin expatriates in the United States
Albanian Roman Catholic archbishops
Bishops appointed by Pope John Paul II
20th-century Roman Catholic archbishops in Albania
21st-century Roman Catholic archbishops in Albania